Teetlum, (West Frisian: Teatlum) after a nearby terp, also known as Duivenhok  named after the polder it drained, is a drainage mill near the village of Tzum, Friesland, Netherlands. It is a hollow post windmill of the type called spinnenkop by the Dutch. The mill is listed as a Rijksmonument, number 15877 and can be used to drain the adjacent polder.

History

The mill was built around 1800 for draining the private polder Kramershoek, also known as Duivenhok. A merger of several polders around Tzum that was proposed in 1910 which would have left the mill without function and threatened its survival, however the plans were called off in 1924. Around 1960 the gearing was changed so the Archimedes' screw could be powered by a tractor. The windmill then fell into disrepair and was heavily damaged by a storm in April 1973 when the windshaft and sails were thrown to the ground. The head was repaired in 1975 and new stocks fitted in 1986, but the drainage function was not restored until later. In 2010 a stock broke. The stocks were again renewed in 2012, together with the wooden windshaft.

Description

Teetlum is what the Dutch describe as a "spinnenkop" (English: spiderhead mill). It is a small hollow post mill winded by a winch. The brake wheel on the windshaft drives the wallower at the top of the upright shaft in the body (called head on a spinnenkop), which passed through the main post into the substructure. At the bottom of the upright shaft is the crown wheel which drives the wooden Archimedes' screw. The body (called head on a spinnenkop) and octagonal substructure are weatherboarded.

Public access
The mill is not open to the public.

References

Windmills in Friesland
Hollow post mills in the Netherlands
Rijksmonuments in Friesland